San Fernando, officially the City of San Fernando, is a 1st class component city and capital of the province of Pampanga, Philippines. According to the 2020 census, it has a population of 354,666 people.

The city is named after King Ferdinand VI of Spain and placed under the patronage of Saint Ferdinand III of Castile and León, whose feast is celebrated every May 30. Popularly known as the "Christmas Capital of the Philippines", the city holds the annual Giant Lantern Festival every December where large parol are displayed in competition. CNN has hailed the city as 'Asia's Christmas capital.'

History

The town of San Fernando was founded in 1754 from the towns of Bacolor and Mexico. The first church was built in 1755 with wooden walls and nipa roofing. The municipal tribunal was erected later in the year in front of the town plaza using durable materials and thatched nipa roofing. Don Vidal de Arrozal served as its first gobernadorcillo that year.

In 1796, after serving as gobernadorcillo the previous year, Don Ángel Pantaleon de Miranda retired to Barrio Saguin, from where he started setting up his hacienda in Barrio Culiat. The barrio was separated from San Fernando on the December 8, 1829 as the new town of Angeles, with the Los Santos Ángeles Custodios as titular patrons.

An expediente requesting the transfer of the provincial capital of Pampanga to San Fernando was signed on the August 6, 1852. Real Cedula 745, approving the transfer of the provincial capital of Pampanga from Bacolor to San Fernando, was signed on September 11, 1881. This transfer did not, in the event, materialize.

In 1878, actions were made to create the town of Calulut. This new town would be composed of Calulut and the neighboring barrios of Bulaun, Malpitic, Sindalan, La Paz, Lara, Saguin, Telabastagan, Balete, Malinao, Pulung Bulu, Panipuan, Macabacle and the caserio of Pau in San Fernando, and Panipuan, Acle, Suclaban and the sitio of Gandus in Mexico. This plan did not materialize, owing to strong opposition from the parish priest of San Fernando.

Governor-General Eulogio Despujol and Manila Archbishop Bernardino Nozaleda inaugurated the San Fernando railroad station, together with the Bagbag-Mabalacat stretch of the Manila-Dagupan Railroad, on February 2, 1892. The station was second only to Manila in revenues that year, and was thus the most important provincial station of the Manila-Dagupan Railroad. On June 27 of the same year, José P. Rizal made a stopover in the town as part of his mission to recruit members to the La Liga Filipina.

On September 1, 1896, the town was declared to be in a state of war despite its peaceful situation. Brigadier General Diego de los Rios arrived on December 2 to calm the revolution that started in Manila on August 30. General Ruiz Serralde took over Rios's post on June 26, 1897, to maintain the peace in San Fernando. The revolution was not yet at its height with occasional exchanges of fire in some places in Pampanga.

On June 26, 1898, representatives from all Pampanga towns, except Macabebe, gathered in San Fernando to swear allegiance to Gen. Maximino Hizon, who was the provincial military governor and representative of the revolutionary president, Emilio Aguinaldo. On October 9, Aguinaldo and his cabinet visited the town, and were welcomed with so much applause and enthusiastic cheering from the public. He proceeded to the convento which was served as the military headquarters at that time.

On May 4, 1899, Philippine revolutionary troops led by General Antonio Luna burned the casa municipal, the town church and several houses to render them useless to the approaching American forces. On June 16, due to the strategic location of the town, Aguinaldo himself led Filipino forces in the Battle for San Fernando. The plan to retake the town proved unsuccessful. Calulut fell to the Americans on August 9.

On August 15, 1904, the Pampanga provincial government was finally transferred to San Fernando from Bacolor, by virtue of Act No. 1204 signed on July 22, 1904. This was during the term of Governor Macario Arnedo and Municipal President Juan Sengson. The town of Minalin became part of San Fernando that same year. It would regain its political independence in 1909.

On January 2, 1905, the town of Santo Tomas was consolidated with San Fernando by virtue of Act 1208.

On August 12, 1904, U.S. Secretary of War William H. Taft visited the town to get first-hand information and gather ideas for the governance of Pampanga. Owing to the short notice, a bamboo pavilion was hastily constructed for his visit, where he was welcomed with a banquet for 200 people. Taft would later be elected President of the United States.

In 1921, the Pampanga Sugar Development Company (PASUDECO) sugar central began its operations. The company was formed in 1918 by large-scale planters such as José de León, Augusto Gonzales, Francisco Tongio Liongson, Tomás Lazatin, Tomás Consunji, Francisco Hizon, José Henson, and Manuel Urquico in the San Fernando residence of Governor Honorio Ventura as part of a plan to construct a locally financed central.

In 1932, the Socialist Party of the Philippines was founded by Pedro Abad Santos. Two years later, he created and headed the Aguman ding Maldang Talapagobra (AMT). The Abad Santos compound in Barangay San Jose became the focal point of the peasant movement.

On February 14, 1939, Philippine president Manuel L. Quezon proclaimed his social justice program before a gathering of farmers in front of the Municipal Government building.

In 1941, forces of the Imperial Japanese Army occupied the town and placed the municipal government under its supervision. The following year, thousands of Filipino and American prisoners of war walked from Bataan to the San Fernando Train Station in what will be known as the Bataan Death March.

In 1952, the town of Santo Tomas was separated from San Fernando.

In 1986, Paterno Guevarra was sworn in as officer-in-charge of the town after the successful People Power Revolution that toppled the Marcos dictatorship that same year. He was later elected municipal mayor. On December 31, 1987, former mayor Armando Biliwang was campaigning in Barangay San Jose to be elected mayor again when communist insurgents from the New People's Army fired gunshots in his direction, narrowly avoiding getting killed while his nephew was fatally wounded.

In 1990, Philippine president Corazon Aquino inaugurated the Paskuhan Village, the first Christmas village in Asia and the third of its kind in the world. The following year, Mount Pinatubo erupted after over 600 years of dormancy hurling a layer of ash and volcanic debris on the town.

On October 1, 1995, Typhoon Sibyl (Mameng) struck the town. It unleashed floodwaters and mudflows from Mount Pinatubo into the town. The Barangays of Santo Nino, San Juan, San Pedro Cutud and Magliman were severely damaged by lahar. The citizens of San Fernando rallied to save the town by raising funds to build the St. Ferdinand People's Dike. The Pampanga Megadike was constructed the following year, thus preventing further damage to the town.

Cityhood

On January 6, 1997, Mayor Rey Aquino and Senator Gloria Macapagal Arroyo launched the campaign for cityhood. On April 27 of that same year, Rep. Oscar Rodriguez filed House Bill No. 9267 creating the City of San Fernando.

In 2000, House Speaker Arnulfo Fuentebella and Senate President Aquilino Pimentel Jr. signed the approved city charter of San Fernando on December 4 and 13 respectively.

The town officially became a component city on February 4, 2001, following the ratification of Republic Act 8990 in a plebiscite from the previous day, making it the 99th city in the Philippines. Rey Aquino was the city's first mayor.

Geography

Barangays
The City of San Fernando is politically subdivided into 35 barangays.

Climate

Demographics

Religions

The Roman Catholicism is the majority religion in the city; 80% of the population profess it. The city is under the Roman Catholic Archdiocese of San Fernando headed by Florentino Lavarias. Other religion includes Protestantism and Independent Christianity. Islam is also evident in the city. The seat of the Archdiocese of San Fernando is located in the city, the Metropolitan Cathedral of San Fernando.

Economy 

Being at the heart of the province, the city of San Fernando is home to 2 public markets, 39 banks, 48 lending institutions (investors), 38 pawnshops, 17 gasoline stations, 3 cinemas, 39 public and private schools, 7 hospitals, 13 dental offices, 9 hotels, 28 drug stores, 7 discos, 6 foreign exchange firms, 15 garment factories, 24 groceries, 7 supermarkets, 42 insurance companies, 16 security agencies and 70 restaurants. As the provincial capital of Pampanga, San Fernando also hosts regional offices of major Philippine government offices.
SM City Pampanga, the first SM mall in Central Luzon, is a large shopping mall owned by SM Supermalls. SM also has two other malls: SM City San Fernando Downtown, along Consunji Street in the downtown; and SM City Telabastagan, along MacArthur Highway in barangay Telabastagan.
Robinsons Starmills Pampanga or Robinsons Starmills, is a shopping mall owned and operated by Robinsons Malls, the second-largest mall operator in the Philippines. This is the first Robinsons mall in Central Luzon and in Pampanga, and it rivals SM City Pampanga.

Industries

San Fernando serves as one of the agricultural processing centers of Central Luzon. It is a major rice-producing region and an important sugar-producing area. The Pampanga Sugar Development Company (PASUDECO) was once the largest private employer in Pampanga. It is a major sugar-processing plant in the region. Other manufacturing companies with offices in the city include Universal Robina, Zuellig Pharma, Nestlé Philippines, Petrophil, Mondragon Industries, JBTEC Flavors and Blends Inc. Asia Brewery, and Del Monte Corporation. Major food and beverage companies such as San Miguel Corporation, Coca-Cola, Pepsi Cola, and Pampanga's Best, have factories in the city.

Every year during Christmas season, the city becomes the center of production of hand-made parols, which is different from the usual ones for its intricate designs and the illusion of dancing lights, emphasizing the lanterns' vibrant colors. Also, every year around Christmas time is the Giant Parol Festival, where barangays of San Fernando come together for a friendly competition to see which lanterns are the best. The festival itself is held in the middle of December, and is originally held in the town of Bacolor until it was transferred to the city in August 1904, in an event called the Ligligan Parol in the Kapampangan language, which many believe to have never happened in that year. Following the formal transfer of the festival to the city in 1908, the Giant Parol Festival went on to be a tradition that has evolved with lanterns becoming larger and larger and the designs more intricate. Since then, it became a symbol of the city's unity and the resident's labor.

Tourism

Festivals and local events

Places of interest
Monumento Fernandino The monument tells the fourfold aspect of the Fernandino story: a) the penitent girl with lantern, b) the lady with torch, c) the lady making the offering and d) the boatman. The February 4, 2004 (dedicated by Mayor Rey B. Aquino) Monumento Fernandino is a sculptural masterpiece that pays tribute to the city's colorful history and cultural heritage. Its artistic composition when seen from a distance would seem like a sprouting plant amidst a barren landscape.

WOW Philippines Hilaga Formerly known as Paskuhan Village, located near the San Fernando exit of North Luzon Expressway (NLEX), WOW Philippines Hilaga was transformed into a cultural, historical, tourism, trade, and entertainment village by former Secretary Richard J. Gordon in 2003. Its design and concept make it a virtual window to the cultural and historical heritage of the four regions of the North Philippines as well as a showcase for their indigenous products, and arts and crafts. The star-shaped pavilions at the center pays tribute to the skilled lantern makers of San Fernando, Pampanga which produces the biggest lanterns in the world. The complex features a 1,000-seat capacity air-conditioned pavilion for conventions and special events, an open-air amphitheater for outdoor activities, air-conditioned exhibit halls, trade booths, garden restos and a 60-seat capacity conference hall.

Bren Z. Guiao Sports Complex and Convention Center It is a multi-purpose complex with imposing venues for concerts, convention, basketball games, beauty pageants and other sport activities. The 3,000-seat, air-conditioned convention center inside the complex is one of Pampanga's pride.

Archdiocesan Museum and Archives It is housed at the University of the Assumption, and includes antiques and exquisite works of art depicting Pampanga's rich cultural heritage. It contains numerous ecclesiastical artifacts ranging from a huge churchbell to paintings; ivory and wooden statues of all shapes and sizes, vestments worn by priests during Mass and chalices, monstrances, reliquaries and ciboriums made of gold, silver and precious gems, some dating back to the 17th century.

Everybody's Cafe As the province of Pampanga is regarded as the "Culinary Capital of the Philippines", the capital city of San Fernando is home to one of the oldest restaurants in the province - Everybody's Cafe. Located along McArthur Highway in Barangay Del Pilar, this iconic restaurant was built in 1946 by the Jorolan Family and is famous for exotic Kapampangan dishes such as betute (stuffed frogs), kamaru (crickets) and Pindang Damulag (carabao meat). Everybody's Cafe has been featured in international TV shows such as Discovery Travel and Living's Bizarre Foods by Andrew Zimmern and Bobby Chin's World Cafe Asia.

San Fernando Heritage District
The San Fernando Heritage District covers the historic core of San Fernando, including barangay Santo Rosario and parts of barangays San Jose (Panlumacan), Santa Teresita (Baritan), Lourdes (Teopaco), Del Pilar, Santa Lucia and Santo Niño. These important sites are broken down under Heritage Houses, Historic Government Buildings, Schools, and Hospitals, and Historic Industrial Structures and Sites

Churches and other religious structures:
Metropolitan Cathedral of San Fernando (in barangay Santo Rosario)
Church of San Vicente Ferrer (in barangay Calulut) – heavily damaged by renovations
Virgen de los Remedios Church (Barangay Baliti) – damaged by recent renovations
Jeosay Shinhongkong Temple (Barangay San Jose)

Heritage houses:

Hizon-Singian House (A. Consunji Street, Barangay Santo Rosario)
Henson-Hizon House (V. Tiomico Street, Barangay Santo Rosario)
Lazatin House (A. Consunji Street, Barangay Santo Rosario)
Dayrit-Cuyugan House (MacArthur Highway, Barangay Dolores)
Consunji House (A. Consunji Street, Barangay Santo Rosario)
Tabacalera House (A. Consunji Street, Barangay Santo Rosario)
Hizon-Ocampo House (A. Consunji Street, Barangay Santo Rosario)
Santos-Hizon House (A. Consunji Street, Barangay Santo Rosario)
Pampanga Hotel (A. Consunji Street, Barangay Santo Rosario)
Archdiocesan Chancery (A. Consunji Street, Barangay San Jose)

Historic government buildings, schools, and hospitals:
City Hall of San Fernando (A. Consunji Street, Barangay Santo Rosario)
Pampanga Provincial Capitol (Capitol Boulevard, Barangay Santo Niño)
Presidio (Artemio Macalino Street, Barangay Santo Niño)
Provincial High School Building (Capitol Boulevard, Barangay Santo Niño)
Pampanga High School Building (High School Boulevard, Barangay Lourdes)
San Fernando Elementary School (B. Mendoza Street, Barangay Santo Rosario)
Old St. Scholastica's Academy (Pedro Abad Santos Road, Barangay Santa Teresita)
Jose B. Lingad Memorial Regional Hospital (formerly Pampanga Provincial Hospital) (Barangay Dolores)
Virgen de los Remedios Hospital (A. Consunji Street, Barangay San Jose)

Industrial heritage:
San Fernando Train Station (Barangay Santo Niño)
PASUDECO Sugar Central (Capitol Boulevard, Barangay Santo Niño)
PASUDECO Staff Houses and Commissary (Capitol Boulevard, Barangay Santo Niño)
San Fernando Water Reservoir (Barangay Lourdes)
The Sugar Pugons (Greenville Subdivision and Barangay Quebiawan)
Calulut Train Station (Barangay Calulut) – heavily damaged by informal settlers
Baluyut Bridge (Gen. Hizon Avenue, Barangay Santo Rosario)
The Arcaded Shop Buildings of Consunji Street - 1950s (Barangay Santo Rosario)
Lantern Factories - Several lantern factories can be visited in Unisite Subdivision, Barangay Del Pilar, as well as in Barangays Santa Lucia, San Jose and Dolores.

Government

List of local chief executives
This is the list of the mayors of City of San Fernando.

Education

Colleges and universities

Vocational / Technical Schools
TESDA PEO Training Center
La Plata Science and Technology, Inc.
Lorraine Computer & Technical School
NorthPoint Academy for Culinary Arts - premiere culinary school in Pampanga
Emmanual John Institute Of Science and Technology
Gateways Institute of Science and Technology

Secondary schools

Media
The City of San Fernando has four TV stations - UBC Channel 12, Infomax Channel 44, Central Luzon Television Channel 36 (CLTV36) and ABS-CBN TV-46 Pampanga. There are three radio stations, the 5 Kilowatt RW 95.1 FM of the RadioWorld Broadcasting Corporation of the Philippines, 91.9 Bright FM, owned and Operated by Archdiocese of San Fernando  and the 2.5 kilowatt 92.7 Brigada News FM Central Luzon of the Brigada Mass Media Corporation.

Several local newspapers are published in the city which includes SunStar Pampanga, The Probe, Coffee Punch, Pampanga Times and the Observer.

Notable personalities
José Abad Santos, a former Chief Justice (featured in PHP1000 bill)
Nicolasa Dayrit, a revolutionary hero
Pedro Abad Santos, a former assemblyman and founder of the Aguman ding Talapagobra ning Pilipinas
Amando G. Dayrit, a renowned pre-war newspaper columnist
Vivencio Cuyugan, first Socialist mayor in the Philippines
Conrado Dayrit, a cardiologist, virgin coconut oil proponent and President of the National Academy of Science and Technology (1992–1999)
Fernando H. Ocampo, a founder of the UST College of Architecture and Fine Arts
Zoilo Hilario, poet, playwright, lawmaker and linguist.
Vicente Abad Santos, 39th Secretary of the Department of Justice, 96th Associate Justice of the Supreme Court of the Philippines
Sotero Baluyut, a former senator and cabinet secretary
Honesto Ongtioco, first Bishop of the Diocese of Cubao, Quezon City and formerly the second Bishop of the Diocese of Balanga, Bataan.
Ruben Enaje, notable Filipino man made famous from crucifying himself in the name of God every year since 1985
Oscar Albayalde, Police officer who serves as the 22nd chief of the Philippine National Police.
Brillante Mendoza, award-winning film director

Sister cities
 Angeles City
 Mabalacat

References

External links

 
City of San Fernando, Pampanga Facebook Community Page
 [ Philippine Standard Geographic Code]
Philippine Census Information
Local Governance Performance Management System

 
1754 establishments in the Philippines
Cities in Pampanga
Populated places established in 1754
Provincial capitals of the Philippines
Component cities in the Philippines